The Yangtze Service Medal is a decoration of the United States military which was created in 1930 for presentation to members of the United States Navy and United States Marine Corps (and to a lesser extent, members of the United States Army).  The Yangtze Service Medal is awarded for service in the Yangtze River Valley between the dates of September 3, 1926 and December 31, 1932, a period of significant unrest in the region.

The decoration may also be awarded for those military service members who served on permanent duty in Shanghai, China, provided such service was in direct support of landing operations in the Yangtze River Valley (e.g. Nanking incident of 1927).  The Yangtze Service Medal was declared obsolete in 1940 when it was replaced by the China Service Medal.

The designer of the Yangtze Service Medal is John R. Sinnock of the Philadelphia Mint. Sinnock was the eighth Chief Engraver of the United States Mint from 1925 to 1947.

See also
Awards and decorations of the United States military
Yangtze Patrol

References

United States service medals